Sphingomonas oligophenolica  is a Gram-negative, strictly aerobic and non-motile bacteria from the genus of Sphingomonas which has been isolated from paddy field soil in Japan. Sphingomonas oligophenolica has the ability to degrade phenolic acids.

References

Further reading

External links
Type strain of Sphingomonas oligophenolica at BacDive -  the Bacterial Diversity Metadatabase

oligophenolica
Bacteria described in 2004